The MV Limerick was an  refrigerated cargo ship built by William Hamilton & Co, Glasgow in 1925 for the Union Steamship Company of New Zealand.

Fate
All but two of the crew were rescued by Colac. I-177 escaped unharmed.

Wreck
The wreck of the Limerick lies in 100 m of water, about 18 km east of Ballina. Discovered by local anglers, the wreck's identity was officially confirmed on 2 February 2013, when it was mapped by the marine research vessel Southern Surveyor.

Citations

1925 ships
Ships built on the River Clyde
Maritime incidents in April 1943
World War II shipwrecks in the Pacific Ocean
Ships sunk by Japanese submarines